Sichuan University (SCU) is a national key public research university in Chengdu, Sichuan, China. The university is wholly funded by the Ministry of Education.

SCU is one of the top universities of China, and a Class A Double First Class University. It is a member of various education projects aiming at developing elite universities, including the Double First Class University Plan, the former Project 211, and the former Project 985.

The current Sichuan University results from the merger of three institutions in 1994: the former Sichuan University, the Chengdu University of Science and Technology (CUST) and the West China University of Medical Sciences (WCUMS).

History 

Sichuan University is one of the earliest institutions of higher education in China. Its earliest predecessor was the Sichuan Chinese and Western School (四川中西學堂), a school established in 1896 that combined traditional and modern methods of education. In 1902, it was merged with two traditional Chinese academies, the Jinjiang Shuyuan (錦江書院, founded 1740) and the Zunjing Shuyuan (尊經書院, founded 1875), and became known as the Sichuan Higher School (四川高等学堂, later 四川高等学校). In 1916, after another merger with a normal school, it was renamed the National Chengdu Higher Normal School (國立成都高等師範學校). In the late 1920s, the institution was briefly divided into three universities, namely the National Chengdu University, the Chengdu Normal University and the Public Sichuan University. In 1931, however, they were reintegrated to form the National Sichuan University (國立四川大學). By 1949, the National Sichuan University had been developed into one of the largest multidisciplinary universities in China, with arts, science, engineering, agriculture, law, and normal schools and a total of 25 departments.

After the foundation of the PRC, the name was changed to Sichuan University. In the 1950s, the national "adjustment of colleges and departments" (院系调整) was organized, after which SCU specialized in arts and science. The schools of engineering and agriculture was mostly split off to form two new universities: the Engineering Institute of Chengdu (成都工学院) and the Sichuan Institute of Agriculture. The normal school was merged into Southwest Normal University and Sichuan Teachers College. The school of law became part of the Southwest College of Political Science and Law. A number of departments in agriculture was transferred to the Southwest Institute of Agriculture, while the department of aeronautics was affiliated under the Beijing Institute of Aeronautics.

Engineering Institute of Chengdu, established in 1954, specialized in chemical engineering, hydroelectricity, mechanics, textiles, and light industry. In 1978, it was renamed to Chengdu University of Science and Technology (CUST).

The West China School of Medicine was originally founded as a private medical school, known as West China Union College. It became a public university after the foundation of the PRC, being renamed to Sichuan Medical College in 1953 and West China University of Medical Science (WCUMS) in 1985. It was established in 1910 by five Christian missionary groups from the U.S., UK and Canada, with offered courses in stomatology, biomedicine, basic medicine and clinical medicine.

In 1994, the SCU, CUST and WCUMS merged to form the Sichuan Union University (四川联合大学). The university adopted the current name in 1998.

Today, Sichuan University is the largest and most comprehensive university in Western China. SCU grants doctorates in twelve main disciplines and 111 subordinate disciplines. It also has six professional degree programs, and has 16 disciplines for postdoctoral research. The 109 bachelor's degree programs SCU grants cover the main fields in liberal arts, sciences, engineering, medicine and agriculture. Its current student population is more than 70,000.

Sichuan University has been listed on the Entity List of the United States Department of Commerce's Bureau of Industry and Security since 2012 due to the Sichuan University Institute of Nuclear Science and Technology's involvement in nuclear weapons development.

Faculty
Sichuan University has a current total staff of 11,357, among which 1,323 are professors, 2,345 associate professors, 13 academicians of Chinese Academy of Sciences and Chinese Academy of Engineering, 434 PhD Supervisors, and 17 members of the Academic Degrees Committee and the Discipline Appraisal Group under the State Council. SCU has 23 professorships from the Yangtze River Scholar Award Plan (9 lecture professor).

Research

Sichuan University has two national key labs, six national engineering centers, five ministerial (MOE) key labs, 35 provincial key labs, 10 ministerial and provincial centers, four key research bases for humanities and social sciences, and four clinical research bases at the national level. The university has invested significantly in research, teaching and medical equipment, with a total value of about 530 million RMB.

SCU has undertaken and completed a number of national, ministerial and regional research projects, and has many achievements that are rated first class in China. The university publishes more than 4,000 research papers annually.

In 2002, the university's state and central government funding ranked fifth among Chinese universities; it was ranked seventh for the number of publications and eleventh for publications included in SCI. The citations ranked fifteenth among Chinese universities. The number of publications in science, engineering and medicine ranked sixth, and the citations ranked seventh among Chinese universities. In 2002, the university applied for 121 patents, 102 out of which were invention-oriented, making it number eighth among peer schools.

Rankings and Reputation 
Sichuan University is one of the members of Project 985 (Top Type) and it is one of only two universities in Western China region (alongside Xi'an Jiao tong University) ranking among the top-15 comprehensive research universities nationwide. It is consistently ranked # 1 in Southwest China, which comprises Chongqing Municipality, Sichuan Province, Guizhou Province, Yunnan Province, and Tibet Autonomous Region with a combination of more than 180 million population.

Internationally, Sichuan University is regarded as one of the most reputable Chinese universities by the Times Higher Education World Reputation Rankings where, it ranked 61st globally as of 2022.

As of 2022, Sichuan University was ranked #101-150 band by Academic Ranking of World Universities and #304 globally by U.S. News & World Report Best Global University Ranking.

Global Ranking of Sichuan University by U.S. News & World Report Best Global University Ranking

Facilities

The university has four libraries containing ca. 5.5 million volumes in total. The libraries also serve as the Collection Center for English Publications under the National Educational, Scientific and Cultural Organization, Ministry of Education Information Center for Liberal Arts Literature and CALIS Southwest Sub-center. The National University Scientific and Technological Projects and Achievements Consulting Center, and Center for Medical Literature Retrieval in Southwest China are served by the SCU library as well.

The university museum is the only one of its kind in China with a comprehensive collection of over 40,000 cultural relics, and over 600,000 animal and plant specimens, ranking first in its holdings among the others in China.

The university stadium is fully equipped and served as the main field for the Sixth National Collegiate Sports Meet. Other facilities available include a campus web center, an analytic and testing center, university archives, the university press, a national foreign language examination center and intensive language training center, four attached hospitals, and one attached health school. The university publishes 37 academic periodicals for domestic and overseas audience.

Campuses

Sichuan University's three campuses are located in Chengdu, the capital city of Sichuan Province. The older Wangjiang (望江) campus is in central Chengdu, adjacent to the Jinjiang River and its tributary the Jiang'an River. The nearby Huaxi (华西) campus is the site of the medical school. The Jiang'an (江安) campus was built in 2003 in Shuangliu County about 12.5 km away from the older campuses; it covers an area of about 4.7 km2 and has total floorage of more than 2.7 million m2. New attending students (most of them) will spend their first and second year in Jiang'an Campus (the newest campus) and then moving to Wangjiang campus for the rest of their college years.

Colleges and schools

The university has over 30 colleges or schools in various disciplines, including: 
 Wu Yuzhang Honors College, the elite undergraduate college of Sichuan University. Each year, only about 1.5% freshmen from various L&S and Engineering majors of Sichuan University will be able to join Wu Yuzhang Honors College.
 College of Physical Science and Technology
 The College of Physical Science and Technology is located in Wangjiang Campus. The Department of Physics was established in 1928. There are two key national disciplines: Atomic and Molecular Physics, and Nuclear Technology. Other study areas include Optics and Condensate Matter Theory. Condensate Matter physics carries out its research in the microscopic electron transportation lab. 
College of Arts
College of Foreign Languages and Cultures
College of Mathematics
College of Computer Science
College of Software Engineering
College of Electrical Engineering
College of Electronics and Information Engineering
School of Chemical Engineering
School of Pharmacy
 College of Water Resource & Hydropower
West China College of Stomatology, which was the earliest hospital of stomatology and had a significant role in the development of modern stomatology in China. A dental clinic called Renji Dental Clinic was founded in 1907, and was expanded to the first dental hospital in China in 1912. In 1917 the medical faculty of West China Union University (WCUU) established a department of dentistry, which in 1921 became the school of dentistry of WCUU. It was renamed as Hospital of Stomatology, Sichuan Medical College in 1953. It was renamed as the School of Stomatology, West China University of Medical Sciences in 1985 and as the West China College of Stomatology, Sichuan University in 2000. Peter Hessler wrote that the students of that school were "The ultimate campus élite, the Brahmins of Sichuan University" and that students in other departments "resented" them.
 Institute of Semiotics and Media Studies (ISMS), founded in 2006 by Professor Henry (Yiheng) Zhao. The ISMS has research focused on the semiotics of video games, brand, fashion, tourism, gift, celebrities and other topics of popular culture. Interdisciplinary studies integrating semiotics with Marxism, psychoanalysis, gender studies phenomenology, existentialism, hermeneutics, and post-modernism have been an ISMS focus.
West China Medical Center of Sichuan University. 
Sichuan University-the Hong Kong Polytechnic University Institute for Disaster Management and Reconstruction
Sichuan University - Pittsburgh University Institute, a new academic entity jointly established by Sichuan University and the University of Pittsburgh.

Notable people associated with Sichuan University 

Zhang Lan, social activist, educationist, and former vice-chairman of the Chinese Central Government, and Wu Yuzhang, revolutionary and educationist, were once the president of the university. Other notable people who studied at SCU include Marshal Zhu De, one of the founding fathers of the People's Republic of China and the People's Liberation Army; Guo Moruo, a literary expert and previous president of Chinese Academy of Science; Jinde Cao, dean of the School of Mathematics at Southeast University; and Ba Jin, a well-known Chinese author.

Other notable people include:
Yang Shangkun (杨尚昆)
Dai Bingguo (戴秉国)
Feng Youlan (冯友兰)
Tong Dizhou (童第周)
Zhu Guangqian (朱光潜)
Ke Zhao (柯召)
Pu Baoming (蒲保明)
Song Yonghua (宋永華)

See also 
 List of universities in China
 West China Union University

References

External links 
 

 
1896 establishments in China
Educational institutions established in 1896

Universities in China with English-medium medical schools
Universities and colleges in Chengdu
Project 211
Project 985
Vice-ministerial universities in China